is the third album by the Italian cantautori, Simone Tomassini. It was released in 2006 on the Makno Music label, owned by Enrico Rovelli, the ex-manager of Vasco Rossi and Patti Pravo and founder of the Alcatraz Club in Milan. The album was toured throughout Italy in the summer of 2006, and track 2, "Fuori come un balcone", was chosen for the sound track of Jerry Calà's 2006 film, Vita Smeralda. In addition to twelve original songs written and sung by Tomassini, Sesso Gioia Rock 'n' Roll includes his version of the Guns N' Roses song "Don't Cry" (track 3, "Non piangere mai").

Also performing on the album are Roberto Colombo (synthesizer and bass), Vince Tempera (piano and Hammond organ), Pierluigi Mingotti (bass), and Giancarlo Bianchetti (acoustic guitar). The album is distributed by Delta Dischi.

Track list
 (lyrics and music by Simone Tomassini) – 3:29
 (lyrics and music by Tomassini) – 3:27
 (by Izzy Stradlin and Axl Rose, arrangement and Italian lyrics by Tomassini) – 4:31
 (lyrics by Tomassini and Andrea Ge, music by Tomassini) – 4:47
 (lyrics by Tomassini, music by Riccardo Di Filippo) – 3:41
 (lyrics and music by Tomassini) – 3:33
 (lyrics and music by Tomassini) – 3:53
 (lyrics by Tomassini, music by Roberto Colombo) – 2:49
 (lyrics and music by Tomassini) – 3:50
 (lyrics and music by Tomassini) – 3:38
 (lyrics and music by Tomassini) – 3:32
 (lyrics and music by Tomassini) – 2:37
 (lyrics and music by Tomassini) – 3:17

Production staff

Vince Tempera (artistic producer)
Maurizio Biancani (mastering)
Giuseppe Spada (design)

Pierluigi Mingotti (assistant producer)
Fausto Demetrio (Pro Tools)
Gianluca Gadda (mixing)

References

External links
Video: Sesso gioia rock 'n' roll on the artist's official YouTube channel

Simone Tomassini albums
2006 albums